Gaston is the name of a brown fur seal that lived in Prague Zoo in years 1991–2002. He became famous during the 2002 European floods when he escaped from the zoological garden, when the rising waters of the Vltava river flooded his tank at Prague zoo. He was recaptured north of Dresden and subsequently died due to exhaustion and infection.

Gaston was memorialized with a statue in the Prague Zoo.

References 

Individual seals and sea lions
2002 animal deaths
Missing or escaped animals
Individual animals in the Czech Republic